The 19th Academy Awards were held on March 13, 1947, honoring the films of 1946, hosted by Jack Benny.

The Best Years of Our Lives won seven of its eight nominations, including Best Picture, Best Director, and both male acting Oscars. The Academy awarded Harold Russell—a World War II veteran who had lost both hands in the war—an Honorary Academy Award for "bringing hope and courage to his fellow veterans" for his role as Homer Parrish, believing that, as a non-actor, he would not win the Best Supporting Actor award for which he was nominated. Russell also won the competitive award, making him the only person in Academy history to receive two Oscars for the same performance.

This was the first time since the 2nd Academy Awards that every category had, at most, five nominations.

Awards

Nominees were announced on February 9, 1947. Winners are listed first and highlighted in boldface.

Academy Honorary Awards 

 Laurence Olivier "for his outstanding achievement as actor, producer and director in bringing Henry V to the screen".
 Harold Russell "for bringing hope and courage to his fellow veterans through his appearance in The Best Years of Our Lives".
 Ernst Lubitsch "for his distinguished contributions to the art of the motion picture".

Irving G. Thalberg Memorial Award
Samuel Goldwyn

Academy Juvenile Award
Claude Jarman Jr.

Presenters
Lionel Barrymore (Presenter: Best Supporting Actress)
Douglas Fairbanks Jr. (Presenter: Short Subject Awards, the Scientific & Technical Awards and Documentary Awards)
Joan Fontaine (Presenter: Best Actor)
Greer Garson (Presenter: Best Art Direction)
Rex Harrison (Presenter: Best Film Editing, Best Sound Recording and Best Special Effects)
Van Johnson (Presenter: Best Original Song)
Eric Johnston (Presenter: Best Motion Picture)
Ray Milland (Presenter: Best Actress)
Robert Montgomery (Presenter: Writing Awards)
Donald Nelson (Presenter: Irving G. Thalberg Memorial Award)
Ronald Reagan and Jane Wyman (Presenters: Show Introduction)
Anne Revere (Presenter: Best Supporting Actor)
Ann Sheridan (Presenter: Best Cinematography)
Shirley Temple (Presenter: Honorary Awards)
Lana Turner (Presenter: Scoring Awards)
Billy Wilder (Presenter: Best Director)

Performers
Hoagy Carmichael
Dick Haymes
Andy Russell
Dinah Shore

Multiple nominations and awards

The following 16 films received multiple nominations:
 8 nominations: The Best Years of Our Lives
 7 nominations: The Yearling
 6 nominations: The Jolson Story
 5 nominations: Anna and the King of Siam and It's a Wonderful Life
 4 nominations: Henry V, The Killers and The Razor's Edge
 3 nominations: Brief Encounter
 2 nominations: Blue Skies, Centennial Summer, Duel in the Sun, The Green Years, The Harvey Girls, Notorious and To Each His Own

The following four films received multiple awards:
 7 wins: The Best Years of Our Lives
 2 wins: Anna and the King of Siam, The Jolson Story and The Yearling

See also
4th Golden Globe Awards
1946 in film
 1st Tony Awards

References

Academy Awards ceremonies
1946 film awards
1947 in Los Angeles
1947 in American cinema
March 1947 events in the United States